Taraldsen is a surname. Notable people with the surname include:

Arne Taraldsen (1917–1989), Norwegian artist and resistance member
Knut Tarald Taraldsen (born 1948), Norwegian linguist 

Norwegian-language surnames